Marlene Riding In Mameah (March 5, 1933 – July 10, 2018) was a Pawnee Native American silversmith and painter.

Born Marlene Mary Riding In in Payne County, Oklahoma, Mameah was a member of the Pawnee Nation of Oklahoma.

Education
Mameah attended Chilocco Indian School. She then went to Bacone College, where she wished to study silver smithing. But the class was unavailable to women, and she was required to take painting classes instead; she later learned to work silver while working for a jeweler. Her instructor was W. Richard West, Sr. (Southern Cheyenne)

Art career
In 1950, her painting Morning Star Ceremony, submitted under the name "M. Riding Inn", received a prize of $150 in the Indian Annual's Plains division.

Mameah taught metalworking at Pawnee Nation College. She won numerous honors throughout her career, and in 2007 was named the Honored One of the Red Earth Festival. Morning Star Ceremony is owned by the Philbrook Museum of Art.

References

External links
 Marlene Riding In Mameah obituary, poteetfuneralhome.com; accessed July 21, 2018.
Oral History Interview with Marlene Riding In Mameah

1933 births
2018 deaths
20th-century American painters
20th-century American women artists
20th-century indigenous painters of the Americas
21st-century American artists
21st-century American women artists
American silversmiths
American women painters
Artists from Oklahoma
Bacone College alumni
Native American jewelers
Pawnee people
People from Payne County, Oklahoma
Women silversmiths
Women jewellers
Native American women artists
20th-century Native American women
20th-century Native Americans
21st-century Native American women
21st-century Native Americans